Afro is an album by trumpeter Dizzy Gillespie, released in 1954 on the Norgran label. Gillespie worked with many Cuban musicians on the album.

Reception
The AllMusic review states "Pairing Dizzy Gillespie with Cuban arranger/composer Chico O'Farrill produced a stunning session which originally made up the first half of a Norgran LP... A later small-group session features the trumpeter with an all-Latin rhythm section and flutist Gilberto Valdes... it is well worth acquiring."

Track listing
 "Manteca Theme" (Gil Fuller, Dizzy Gillespie, Chano Pozo) - 4:10 
 "Contraste" (Gillespie, Chico O'Farrill, Pozo) - 2:45 
 "Jungla" (Gillespie, O'Farrill, Pozo) - 4:44 
 "Rhumba Finale" (Gillespie, O'Farrill, Pozo) - 4:43 
 "A Night in Tunisia" (Gillespie, Frank Paparelli) - 4:19 
 "Con Alma" (Gillespie) - 5:05 
 "Caravan" (Duke Ellington, Irving Mills, Juan Tizol) - 7:19

Personnel
Dizzy Gillespie - trumpet
Gilbert Valdez - flute (tracks 5-7)
Quincy Jones, Jimmy Nottingham, Ernie Royal - trumpet (tracks 1-4)
Leon Comegys, J. J. Johnson, George Matthews - trombone (tracks 1-4)
George Dorsey, Hilton Jefferson - alto saxophone (tracks 1-4)
Hank Mobley, Lucky Thompson - tenor saxophone (tracks 1-4)
Danny Bank - baritone saxophone (tracks 1-4)
Réne Hernandez (tracks 5-7), Wade Legge (tracks 1-4) - piano
Lou Hackney (tracks 1-4), Roberto Rodríguez - bass
Charlie Persip - drums (tracks 1-4)
Cándido Camero - congas, percussion
Mongo Santamaria - congas (tracks 1-4)
José Mangual - bongos
Ubaldo Nieto - timbales
Ralph Miranda - percussion (tracks 5-7)
Chico O'Farrill - arranger (tracks 1-4)

References 

Dizzy Gillespie albums
1954 albums
Norgran Records albums
Albums produced by Norman Granz